TGY may refer to:

 TG&Ymk
 Tieguanyin, a Chinese oolong tea